The 1905 Carlisle Indians football team represented the Carlisle Indian Industrial School as an independent during the 1905 college football season. Led by George Washington Woodruff in his first and only season as head coach, the Indians compiled a record of 10–4 and outscored opponents 354 to 44.

Schedule

References

Carlisle
Carlisle Indians football seasons
Carlisle Indians football